This is a list of events from the year 1988 in the United States.

Incumbents

Federal government 
 President: Ronald Reagan (R-California)
 Vice President: George H. W. Bush (R-Texas)
 Chief Justice: William Rehnquist (Wisconsin)
 Speaker of the House of Representatives: Jim Wright (D-Texas)
 Senate Majority Leader: Robert Byrd (D-West Virginia)
 Congress: 100th

Events

January
 January 1 – 
The Dell Computer Corporation is incorporated.
 The Evangelical Lutheran Church in America is established, creating the largest Lutheran denomination in the United States.
 January 2 – Michigan State Spartans football team wins the Rose Bowl Game against the USC Trojans.
 January 4 – Nick Jr. begins as a block of Nickelodeon programming for younger children.
 January 25
 Ronald Reagan delivers his final State of the Union Address.
 U.S. Vice President George H. W. Bush and CBS News anchor Dan Rather clash over Bush's role in the Iran–Contra scandal during a contentious television interview.
 January 29 – The Midwest Classic Conference, a U.S. college athletic conference, is formed.

February
 February 3 – The Democratic-controlled United States House of Representatives rejects President Ronald Reagan's request for $36,250,000 to support the Nicaraguan Contras.
 February 12 – Anthony M. Kennedy is appointed to the Supreme Court of the United States.
 February 14 – Hours after learning the death of his sister, US speed skater Dan Jansen falls twice and fails to win a medal in the 500-meter race in the Calgary Winter Olympics.
 February 16 – Gunman Richard Farley kills seven people inside his former workplace, ESL Incorporated in Sunnyvale, California. He had been stalking colleague Laura Black who still worked there; however, she survived the shooting. Farley is currently on death row.
 February 17 – U.S. Lieutenant Colonel William R. Higgins, serving with a United Nations group monitoring a truce in southern Lebanon, is kidnapped (he is later killed by his captors).
 February 24 – Hustler Magazine v. Falwell: The Supreme Court of the United States sides with Hustler magazine by overturning a lower court decision to award Jerry Falwell $200,000 for defamation.

March
 March 8 – 
Two U.S. Army helicopters collide in Fort Campbell, Kentucky, killing 17 servicemen.
U.S. presidential candidate George Herbert Walker Bush defeats Bob Dole in numerous Republican primaries and caucuses on "Super Tuesday". The bipartisan primary/caucus calendar, designed by Democrats to help solidify their own nominee early, backfires when none of the six competing candidates are able to break out of the pack in the day's Democratic contests. Jesse Jackson, however, wins several Southern state primaries.
 March 13 – Gallaudet University, a university for the deaf in Washington, D.C., elects Dr. I. King Jordan as the first deaf president in its history, following the Deaf President Now campaign, considered a turning point in the deaf civil rights movement.
 March 16  
 First RepublicBank of Texas fails and enters FDIC receivership, the second-largest FDIC assisted bank failure up to that point.
 Iran-Contra Affair: Lieutenant Colonel Oliver North and Vice Admiral John Poindexter are indicted on charges of conspiracy to defraud the United States.
 March 26 – U.S. presidential candidate Jesse Jackson defeats Michael Dukakis in the Michigan Democratic caucuses, becoming the frontrunner temporarily for the party's nomination. Richard Gephardt withdraws his candidacy after his campaign speeches against imported automobiles fail to earn him much support in Detroit.

April
 Throughout the Month – The unemployment rate drops to 5.4%, the lowest since June 1974.
 April 1 – In Fort Wayne, Indiana, 8-year-old April Marie Tinsley is kidnapped and murdered.
 April 4 – Governor Evan Mecham of Arizona is convicted in his impeachment trial and removed from office.
 April 5 – Massachusetts Governor Michael Dukakis wins the Wisconsin Democratic presidential primary.
 April 11 – The 60th Academy Awards, hosted by Chevy Chase, are held at the Shrine Auditorium in Los Angeles. Bernardo Bertolucci's The Last Emperor wins all nine of its nominations (the first film to do so since 1958's Gigi), including Best Picture and Best Director.
 April 12 – Former pop singer Sonny Bono is elected Mayor of Palm Springs, California.
 April 14 – The USS Samuel B. Roberts strikes a naval mine in the Persian Gulf, while deployed on Operation Earnest Will, during the Tanker War phase of the Iran–Iraq War.
 April 18 – The United States Navy retaliates for the Roberts mining with Operation Praying Mantis, in a day of strikes against Iranian oil platforms and naval vessels.

May
 May 4 – PEPCON disaster in Henderson, Nevada: A major explosion at an industrial solid-fuel rocket plant causes damage extending up to ten miles away, including Las Vegas's McCarran International Airport.
 May 14 – Bus collision near Carrollton, Kentucky: A drunk driver traveling in the wrong direction on Interstate 71 hits a converted school bus carrying a church youth group from Radcliff, Kentucky. The resulting fire kills 27 people, making it tied for first in the U.S. for most fatalities involving 2 vehicles to the present day. Coincidentally, the other 2-vehicle accident involving a bus that also killed 27 occurred in Prestonsburg, Kentucky thirty years prior.
 May 16 – 
A report by U.S. Surgeon General C. Everett Koop states that the addictive properties of nicotine are similar to those of heroin and cocaine.
California v. Greenwood: The U.S. Supreme Court rules that police officers do not need a search warrant to search through discarded garbage.
 May 27 – Microsoft releases Windows 2.1.
 May 31 – U.S. President Ronald Reagan addresses 600 Moscow State University students during his visit to the Soviet Union.

June
 June 1 – The Intermediate-Range Nuclear Forces Treaty, banning intermediate-range missiles in the United States and the Soviet Union, comes into effect.
 June 12 – Rusty Wallace wins the last NASCAR Winston Cup Series Budweiser 400 auto race at Riverside International Raceway in Riverside, California.
 June 14 – A small wildfire is started by a lightning strike in Montana, United States, near the boundary for Yellowstone National Park. The Storm Creek fire expands into the park, then merges with dozens of other drought-aggravated fires.
 June 22 – Back to the Future director Robert Zemeckis releases Who Framed Roger Rabbit through Touchstone Pictures to universal acclaim and box office success. It brings a renewed interest in the Golden Age of American animation, spearheading modern American animation and the Disney Renaissance.
 June 28 – Four workers are asphyxiated at a metal-plating plant in Auburn, Indiana, in the worst confined-space industrial accident in U.S. history (a fifth victim dies two days later).
 June 29 – Morrison v. Olson: The United States Supreme Court upholds the law allowing special prosecutors to investigate suspected crimes by executive branch officials.

July
 July 3 – Iran Air Flight 655 is shot down by a missile launched from the USS Vincennes.
 July 4 – In Zurich Switzerland FIFA chose the United States as the venue to organize the 1994 FIFA World Cup, the United States won with 10 votes, surpassed Morocco with 7 votes and Brazil with 3 votes.
 July 6 – The first reported medical waste on beaches in the Greater New York area (including hypodermic needles and syringes possibly infected with the AIDS virus) washes ashore on Long Island. Subsequent medical waste discoveries on beaches in Coney Island, Brooklyn and in Monmouth County, New Jersey, force the closure of numerous New York–area beaches in the middle of one of the hottest summers on record in the American Northeast.
 July 13 – Miami Arena in Miami, Florida opens.
 July 14 – Volkswagen closes its Westmoreland Assembly Plant after ten years of operation (the first factory built by a non-American automaker in the U.S.).
 July 20 – The Democratic National Convention in Atlanta, Georgia nominates Michael Dukakis as their presidential candidate and Lloyd Bentsen as his running mate.
 July 26 – The death of Tate Rowland leads way to publicized rumors of a Satanic cult in the rural community of Childress, Texas.

August
 August 6–7 – Tompkins Square Park Police Riot in New York City: A riot erupts in Tompkins Square Park when police attempt to enforce a newly passed curfew for the park. Bystanders, artists, residents, homeless people and political activists are caught up in the police action, which takes place during the night of August 6 and into the early morning of August 7.
August 8 - the gangster rap group N.W.A. releases their first studio album Straight Outta Compton wich is considered to be one of the first forms of gangster rap.
 August 9 – Wrigley Field has its first night game of baseball, ending long opposition to lights at the field.
 August 17 – Pakistani President Muhammad Zia-ul-Haq and the U.S. ambassador to Pakistan, Arnold Raphel, are killed in a plane crash near Bhawalpur.
 August 18 – The Republican National Convention in New Orleans, Louisiana nominates Vice President George H. W. Bush as their presidential candidate and Dan Quayle as his running mate.

September

 September 5 – With the US's largest thrift institution, American Savings and Loan Association, entering receivership, the Robert M. Bass Group (headed by Robert Bass) agrees to buy its good assets with US$1.7 billion in federal aid (completed December).
 September 10 – Kids' Court debuts on Nickelodeon.
 September 15 – Nicholas F. Brady is sworn in as the new Secretary of Treasury, succeeding James Baker.
 September 17-October 2 – The United States participates in the 1988 Summer Olympics in Seoul, South Korea and ranks in third place, bringing home 36 gold, 31 silver and 27 bronze medals for a total of 94 medals behind the Soviet Union in first place and East Germany in second.
 September 25 – Jim Lehrer hosts the first presidential debate between Michael Dukakis and President Bush at Wake Forest University.
 September 29 – STS-26: NASA resumes Space Shuttle flights, grounded after the 1986 Space Shuttle Challenger disaster, with Space Shuttle Discovery going back into orbit and deploying the TDRS-3 satellite, putting the US back into the Space Race.

October
 October 3 – STS-26 lands at Edwards Air Force Base in California after four days of its successful maiden flight and satellite deployment.
 October 5 – In Omaha, Nebraska, in the only vice presidential debate of the 1988 U.S. presidential election, the Republican vice presidential nominee, Senator Dan Quayle of Indiana, insists he has as much experience in government as John F. Kennedy did when he sought the presidency in 1960. His Democratic opponent, Senator Lloyd Bentsen of Texas, replies, "Senator, I knew Jack Kennedy. I served with Jack Kennedy. Jack Kennedy was a friend of mine. Senator, you're no Jack Kennedy." The audience response to Senator Bentsen's remark is overwhelmingly positive.
 October 13 – In the second U.S. presidential debate, held by U.C.L.A., the Democratic Party nominee, Michael Dukakis, is asked by journalist Bernard Shaw of CNN if he would support the death penalty if his wife, "Kitty", were to be raped and murdered. Gov. Dukakis' reply, voicing his opposition to capital punishment in any and all circumstances, is later said to have been a major reason for the eventual failure of his campaign for the White House.
 October 15 – Kirk Gibson hits a dramatic home run to win Game 1 of the World Series for the Los Angeles Dodgers, over the Oakland Athletics, by a score of 5–4.
 October 20 – The Los Angeles Dodgers defeat the Oakland Athletics, 4 games to 1, to win their 6th World Series Title.
 October 27 – Ronald Reagan decides to tear down the new U.S. Embassy in Moscow because of Soviet listening devices in the building structure.
 October 30 – Philip Morris buys Kraft Foods for US$13,100,000,000.
 October 31 – National Park of American Samoa is established.

November

 Throughout the Month – The unemployment rate drops to 5.3%, the lowest level since May 1974.
 November 2 – The Morris worm, the first computer worm distributed via the Internet, written by Robert Tappan Morris, is launched from MIT.
 November 8 – 1988 United States presidential election: George H. W. Bush is elected as 41st President of the United States over Democratic opponent, Michael Dukakis.
 November 10 – The United States Air Force acknowledges the existence of the Lockheed F-117 Nighthawk in a Pentagon press conference.
 November 11 – In Sacramento, California, police find a body buried in the lawn of sixty-year-old landlady Dorothea Puente. Seven bodies are eventually found and Puente is convicted of three murders and sentenced to life in prison.
 November 13 – Mulugeta Seraw, an Ethiopian law student in Portland, Oregon, is beaten to death by members of the Neo-Nazi group East Side White Pride.
 November 15 – The 300-foot Green Bank Telescope collapses in Green Bank, West Virginia.
 November 18
War on Drugs: U.S. President Ronald Reagan signs a bill providing the death penalty for murderous drug traffickers.
Walt Disney Feature Animation's 27th feature film, Oliver & Company, is released to financial success but a mixed critical reception. The same day, former Disney animator and director Don Bluth released The Land Before Time to more positive reception.
 November 21 – Ted Turner officially buys Jim Crockett Promotions, known as NWA Crockett, and turns it into World Championship Wrestling (WCW).
 November 22 – In Palmdale, California, the first prototype B-2 Spirit stealth bomber is revealed.
 November 30 – Kohlberg Kravis Roberts & Co. buys RJR Nabisco for US$25,000,700,000 in the biggest leveraged buyout deal of all time.

December
 December 1 – The first World AIDS Day is observed.
 December 9 – The last Dodge Aries and Plymouth Reliant roll off the assembly line in a Chrysler factory.
 December 12 – Soviet General Secretary Mikhail Gorbachev begins an official visit to the United States.
 December 14 – After Yasir Arafat renounces violence, the U.S. says it will open dialogue with the PLO.
 December 16 – Perennial U.S. Democratic presidential candidate Lyndon LaRouche is convicted of mail fraud.
 December 19 – Gorbachev cuts short his visit to the United States and returns home to the Soviet Union, as thousands of people have died in an earthquake in Armenia.
 December 21 
 Pan Am Flight 103 is destroyed by a bomb over Lockerbie, Scotland, United Kingdom; killing 270 people, including 178 U.S. citizens.
 Drexel Burnham Lambert agrees to plead guilty to insider trading and other violations and pay penalties of US$650 million.

Undated
 The U.S. Drought of 1988 causes big crop damage in many states, impacts many portions of the United States and causes around $60 billion in damage. Multiple regions suffer in the conditions. Heat waves cause 4,800 to 17,000 excess deaths while scorching many areas of the United States during 1988.
 BlackRock founded as a global asset management company in New York City by Larry Fink and others; it will become the world's largest.
 Southwest Alaska Municipal Conference organization is founded.

Ongoing
 Cold War (1947–1991)

Births

January

 January 1
 Eddie Ababio, Ghanaian-born soccer player
 Zach Clayton, football player
 January 2
 Aaron Barrett, baseball player
 Mandy Harvey, jazz and pop singer
 January 3 – J. R. Hildebrand, racing driver
 January 4
 Azad Al-Barazi, Syrian-born Olympic swimmer
 Corbin Bryant, football player
 John Clay, football player
 January 5 – Charlie Campbell, soccer player
 January 6 – Roger Bothe, soccer player
 January 7
 Haley Bennett, actress and singer
 Jhoulys Chacín, Venezuelan-born baseball player
 January 8
 Allison Harvard, model
 Lily Nicksay, actress
 Alex Tyus, American-born Israeli basketball player
 January 9
 V. Bozeman, singer and actress
 Mike Champa, singer, rapper, musician, and frontman for For All Those Sleeping
 Katherine Copely, American-born Lithuanian ice dancer
 January 11
 Travon Bellamy, football player
 Blair Brandt, political adviser
 Joseph Collins, football player
 January 12
 George Clanton, electronic musician and singer/songwriter
 Andrew Lawrence, actor, singer, and director 
 January 13 – Tatev Abrahamyan, Armenian-born chess grandmaster
 January 14
 Cal Barnes,  actor, director, screenwriter, producer, novelist, and playwright
 Mikalah Gordon, singer
 Hakeem Nicks, football player
 January 15
 Skrillex, musician and DJ
 Jessica Poland, singer/songwriter
 January 16 – Bull Dempsey, wrestler
 January 17 – Earl Clark, basketball player
 January 18
 Carlos Borja, soccer player
 Ashleigh Murray, actress and singer
 January 19
 Kyle Adams, football player
 Allison Aldrich, Paralympic volleyball player
 Beedie, rapper
 Bonnie Brawner, Paralympic volleyball player
 Kris Cooke, football player
 JaVale McGee, basketball player
 January 20
 Corey Allmond, basketball player
 Emanuel Cook, football player
 January 21
 Preston Claiborne, baseball player
 Ashton Eaton, Olympic decathlete
 Vanessa Hessler, American-born Italian model and actress
 January 22
 Asher Allen, football player
 Nick Palatas, actor
 Xavier Silas, basketball player and coach
 January 23
 Terrance Campbell, basketball player
 Wil Carter, basketball player
 January 25
 Da'Sean Butler, basketball player and coach
 Jason Colwick, pole vaulter
 January 26
 Dan Bailey, football player
 Jack Combs, ice hockey player
 January 27 – Ashley Battersby, freestyle skier
 January 28
 Pierce Brown, science fiction author
 Alexandra Krosney, actress
 Quentin Oliver Lee, actor and singer (d. 2022)
 Yuriy Sardarov, Azerbaijani-born actor
 January 29
 Alex Albright, football player
 Jake Auchincloss, politician
 Mike Bolsinger, baseball player
 Cyntoia Brown, convicted murderer
 Clifford Chapin, voice actor and director
 Eugene Clifford, football player
 Hank Conger, baseball player and coach
 January 30
 Keshia Baker, Olympic sprinter
 Josh Brent, football player
 Ben Cosgrove, composer
 Rob Pinkston, actor
 January 31
 Vance Albitz, baseball player
 Kyle Kulinski, political commentator

February

 February 1 – Brett Anderson, baseball player
 February 2 – Zosia Mamet, actress
 February 3 – Justin Bonsignore, stock car racing driver
 February 4
 Charlie Barnett, actor
 Carly Patterson, Olympic gymnast
 February 5 – Katie Bell, Olympic diver
 February 6
 David Boyd, Danish-born singer/songwriter and frontman for New Politics
 Anna Diop, actress
 Bailey Hanks, singer, actress and dancer
 February 7
 Quintin Borders, football player
 Matthew Stafford, football player
 February 8
 Neil Barlow, soccer player
 Jahlil Beats, hip hop producer
 February 9 – Donald Buckram, football player and coach
 February 10
 Jake Brigham, baseball player
 Marco Capozzoli, football player
 February 11 – Barry Church, football player
 February 12 
 DeMarco Murray, football player
 Greta Morgan, singer/songwriter and pianist
 Mike Posner, singer/songwriter and producer
 February 14
 Rob Callaway, football player
 Matt Campanale, ice hockey player
 Paul Clemens, baseball player
 Asia Nitollano, singer and dancer
 February 15
 Brooke Abel, Olympic swimmer
 Jade Buford, stock car racing driver
 Caleb Clay, baseball player
 February 16
 Neli A'asa, football player
 Chris Butler, cyclist
 Kat Cammack, politician
 Steven Caple Jr., director, producer, and screenwriter
 Jacquelyn Crowell, cyclist (d. 2018)
 February 17
 Brian Burrows, Olympic sports shooter
 Jake LaTurner, politician
 February 18
 Mason Brodine, football player
 Shane Lyons, actor, chef, and restaurateur
 Sarah Sutherland, actress
 Maiara Walsh, Brazilian-born actress
 February 19
 Xavier Brown, football player
 Bruce Carter, football player
 Stacie Chan, actress
 Kevin Chapman, baseball player
 February 20
 Michelle Betos, soccer player
 Tim Crabbe, American-born Italian baseball player
 Kealoha Pilares, football player
 February 22
 Dominic Alford, football player
 Colby Covington, mixed martial artist
 February 23
 Jessica Breland, basketball player
 Clark Burckle, Olympic swimmer
 Byron Maxwell, football player
 February 24
 Devon Beitzel, basketball player
 Brittany Bowe, Olympic speed skater
 Alexander Koch, actor
 February 25
 Nate Adcock, baseball player
 Matthew Baker, soccer player
 Joevan Catron, basketball player
 Gerald McCoy, football player
 February 26
 Dustin Ackley, baseball player
 Demetrius Andrade, boxer
 Cornelius Brown, football player
 Lindsay Burdette, tennis player
 Brad Coleman, stock car racing driver
 Brittnee Cooper, volleyball player
 February 28 – Aroldis Chapman, baseball player

March

 March 1
 Whitney Allison, cyclist
 Trevor Cahill, baseball player
 Ben Casnocha, author, entrepreneur, and investor
 Katija Pevec, actress
 March 3
 Chad Burt, soccer player and coach
 Josh Duggar, television personality
 March 5
 Joe Benson, baseball player
 Brent Brockman, soccer player
 Eric Czerniewski, football player
 March 6 – Dailis Caballero, Cuban-born Olympic pole vaulter
 March 7
 Larry Asante, football player
 James Cleveland, football player
 March 8 – Benny Blanco, musician, songwriter, and record producer
 March 10 – Danny McCray, football player and television personality
 March 11 – Vince Belnome, baseball player
 March 12
 Zahir Carrington, basketball player
 Ritchie Torres, politician
 March 14 
 Stephen Curry, basketball player
 Sasha Grey, actress and model 
 March 15
 Steve Ames, baseball player
 Lil Dicky, rapper and comedian
 March 16 – Jhené Aiko, singer/songwriter
 March 17 – Tyler Bellamy, soccer player
 March 18
 Chase Baird, saxophonist and composer
 Vanessa Borne, wrestler
 March 19
 Clayton Kershaw, baseball player
 Freddie Smith, actor
 March 20
 Kevin Cone, football player
 Louie Vito, American-born Italian Olympic snowboarder
 March 21
 Austin Adamec, Christian musician
 Erik Johnson, ice hockey player
 March 22 – Tania Raymonde, actress
 March 23 – Dellin Betances, baseball player
 March 24
 Felicia Chester, basketball player
 Nick Lashaway, actor (d. 2016)
 March 25
 Darrell Arthur, basketball player
 Big Sean, rapper
 Ryan Lewis, musician
 March 26 – Michael Buttacavoli, golfer
 March 27 – Brenda Song, actress
 March 28
 Austin Armacost, television personality
 Geno Atkins, football player
 Jordan Bridges, politician
 Ryan Kalish, baseball player
 March 29
 Elle Anderson, cyclist
 Kelly Sweet, singer
 March 30
 Capri Anderson, pornographic actress
 Richard Sherman, football player
 March 31 – DeAndre Liggins, baseball player

April

 April 1
 Alyssa Bonagura, singer/songwriter
 Derek Campos, mixed martial artist
 Brook Lopez, basketball player
 April 2
 Garrett Chisolm, football player
 Jesse Plemons, actor
 April 3
 Kam Chancellor, football player
 Brandon Graham, football player
 William Knight, mixed martial artist
 April 7
 Chelsea Alden, actress
 Joseph Bramlett, golfer
 Charles Brewer, baseball player
 Keith Browner Jr., football player
 April 8 – Candice Cuoco, fashion designer
 April 9 – Ryan Broyles, football player
 April 10
 Molly Bernard, actress
 Haley Joel Osment, actor
 April 11 – Pete Kozma, baseball player
 April 12
 Ryan Brooks, basketball player
 Jessie James Decker, country pop singer/songwriter  
 April 13
 Cody Arnoux, soccer player
 Kallie Flynn Childress, actress
 Stephanie Coleman, politician
 Dwayne Collins, basketball player
 Allison Williams, actress
 April 14
 Eric Alexander, soccer player
 Emmanuel Bor, Kenyan-born long-distance runner
 Sarah Bullard, lacrosse player
 Mike Carman, ice hockey player
 Lehmon Colbert, basketball player
 Chris Wood, actor 
 April 15
 Justin Anderson, football player
 Erin Lee Carr, filmmaker
 Bill Clark, basketball player
 Chris Stuckmann, film critic, filmmaker, author, and YouTuber
 April 17
 Kourtnei Brown, football player
 Dasha Gonzalez, wrestler and model
 April 18
 Justin Burrell, basketball player
 Jessica Cambensy, American-born Hong Kong model and actress
 Kayleigh McEnany, political commentator and White House press secretary
 April 19
 Trevor Lee, rapper
 April 20
 Brandon Belt, baseball player
 Nick Bonino, ice hockey player
 April 21
 Robbie Amell, Canadian-born actor and producer
 Ricky Berens, Olympic swimmer
 JR Buensuceso, basketball player
 Jencarlos Canela, singer/songwriter and actor
 Christoph Sanders, actor
 April 23
 Stacey Bridges, rugby player
 Justin Brownlee, basketball player
 Molly Burnett, actress, singer, and producer
 April 24 – Jermaine Cunningham, football player
 April 25
 Rachel Cruze, writer and author
 Sara Paxton, actress, singer, and model
 April 27
 Austin Amelio, actor
 Lizzo, singer/songwriter and rapper
 April 28
 Justin Boren, football player
 Carlos Brown, football player
 Seth C'deBaca, soccer player
 Sebo Walker, skateboarder and artist
 April 29
 Aanders Brorson, Canadian-born curler
 Carson Coffman, football player
 April 30 – Antonio Ballard, basketball player

May

 May 1
 André Anderson, football player
 Nicholas Braun, actor
 Cody Renard Richard, stage manager, producer, and educator
 May 2
 Musa Abdul-Aleem, basketball player
 Shaun Chapas, football player
 May 4
 Christian Bergman, baseball player
 Derrick Caracter, basketball player
 LaRoyce Hawkins, actor, stand-up comic, spoken word artist, and musician
 May 5
 Kevin Alston, soccer player
 Michael Cognata, actor and record producer
 Jessica Dubroff, trainee aviator (d. 1996)
 Brooke Hogan, reality star and singer
 May 6
 Ryan Anderson, basketball player
 Luis Cálix, soccer player
 Marcus Cannon, football player
 Whitney Conder, wrestler
 May 7 – Brandon Jones, actor, musician, and producer
 May 8
 Ivy Audrain, cyclist
 Trisha Paytas, youtuber
 May 9 – Buddy Boshers, baseball player
 May 10
 Mat Franco, magician
 Adam Ward, photojournalist (d. 2015)
 May 11
 Ace Hood, rapper
 Julia Avila, mixed martial artist
 Blac Chyna, model and entrepreneur
 Nikki Cleary, pop rock singer
 Jeremy Maclin, football player
 Danielle Pinnock, actress
 May 13 
 Freddie Braun, soccer player
 Didier Cohen, American-born Australian model
 Tim Maypray, football player (d. 2019)
 Matt McLean, Olympic swimmer
 May 15
 Dillon Bates, politician
 Nate Costa, football player
 May 16 – Julia Adolphe, composer
 May 17 – Nikki Reed, actress, singer/songwriter, and screenwriter
 May 18 – Johnny Culbreath, football player
 May 19
 Mike Alessi, motorcycle racer
 Kevin Basped, football player
 May 20
 Nathaniel Brown, actor and director
 Kayden Carter, wrestler
 May 21 – Chase Baker, football player and coach
 May 22
 Andrew Augustin, video game designer
 Sergio Brown, football player
 Chase Budinger, volleyball player
 Doug DeMuro, automotive columnist and internet personality
 Santana Garrett, wrestler and model
 May 23
 Vic Black, baseball player
 Jackie Briggs, field hockey player
 Morgan Pressel, golfer
 Zachary "Kid Yamaka" Wohlman, boxer
 May 24
 Anhayla, singer/songwriter
 Monica Lin Brown, U.S. Army medic and silver star recipient
 Billy Gilman, singer
 May 25
 Carlos Aguilar, soccer player
 Britta Büthe, American-born German volleyball player
 Bruce Campbell, football player
 Lee Chatfield, politician
 Matt Clare, soccer player
 May 26
 Brad Balsley, sports shooter
 Cami Bradley, singer/songwriter, keyboardist, and television personality
 May 27
 Brad Boxberger, baseball player
 Jacobs Crawley, rodeo cowboy
 Art Cruz, drummer for Lamb of God, Winds of Plague (2008-2022), Prong (2014–2018), and Klogr (2017)
 Stevin John, children's entertainer and educator 
 Alicia Sixtos, actress
 May 28
 Justin Bour, baseball player
 NaVorro Bowman, football player
 Ryan Court, baseball player
 Brian Justin Crum, singer and actor
 May 29
 Derrius Brooks, football player
 Garrett Celek, football player
 Tobin Heath, soccer player
 May 30 – C. R. Crews, racing driver
 May 31 – Rogét Chahayed, record producer and songwriter

June

 June 1 – Brian O'Neill, Olympic ice hockey player
 June 2
 Mustafa Abdul-Hamid, basketball player
 Mister Alexander, football player
 Awkwafina, actress, rapper, and comedian
 Joe Young, football player
 June 3
 Patrick Christopher, basketball player
 Dave East, rapper and actor
 June 4
 Matt Bartkowski, ice hockey player
 Marie Gluesenkamp Perez, politician
 June 5 – Steelo Brim, television personality, comedian, and actor
 June 6
 Omar Brown, football player
 Gideon Glick, actor and singer
 June 7
 Chris Barton, cyclist
 Patrick Carlopoli, convicted murderer
 June 9
 Rob Bordson, ice hockey player
 Lauren Landa, actress
 Mae Whitman, actress
 June 10 – Billy Bitter, lacrosse player
 June 11 – Weyes Blood, singer/songwriter and musician
 June 12 
 Dave Melillo, singer/songwriter and guitarist 
 Cody Horn, actress and model
 June 13
 Gabe Carimi, football player
 Chris Cralle, hammer thrower
 June 14 
 Kara Killmer, actress
 Kevin McHale, actor, dancer and singer
  June 16
 Banks, singer/songwriter
 Samantha Brand, American-born Haitian soccer player
 Jermaine Gresham, football player
 June 17 – Ryan Neff, singer and bassist for Miss May I
 June 18 – Josh Dun, drummer for Twenty One Pilots
 June 19 – Alyona Alekhina, Russian-born snowboarder, singer/songwriter, model, and musician
 June 20 – Alex Caceres, mixed martial artist
 June 22 – Portia Doubleday, actress
 June 23 – Chellsie Memmel, Olympic gymnast
 June 24 – Nichkhun Horvejkul, American-born Thai singer
 June 25
 Aaron Berry, football player
 Dorson Boyce, football player
 Joy Cheek, basketball player
 Rose Schlossberg, actress and daughter of Caroline Kennedy
 June 26
 King Bach, Canadian-born actor and internet personality
 John Brown, football player
 Bryant Browning, football player
 Chris Mazdzer, Olympic luger
 Dakota Meyer, Marine veteran in the Afghan War and Medal of Honor Recipient
 June 27
 Miles Burris, football player
 Nate Byham, football player
 Alanna Masterson, actress
 June 28
 Ali Caldwell, singer/songwriter
 Terrence Cody, football player
 June 29
 Danny Bohn, stock car racing driver
 Evan Call, American-born Japanese composer
 June 30
 Tyler Cain, basketball player
 Vinny Curry, football player
 Jack Douglass, YouTuber, musician, and comedian
 Sean Marquette, actor
 Dave Stephens, singer and frontman for We Came as Romans

July

 July 1
 Kurt Coleman, football player
 Craig Curley, marathon runner
 Brian Wang, wushu taolu practitioner
 July 2 – Ronnie Ash, Olympic hurdler
 July 3
 McLeod Bethel-Thompson, football player
 Matty Mullins, singer/songwriter and frontman for Memphis May Fire
 July 4 – Freddie Banks, football player and coach
 July 6
 Carter Camper, ice hockey player
 Adrian Clayborn, football player
 Brittany Underwood, actress and singer
 July 7
 Kaci Brown, singer/songwriter
 Kristi Castlin, Olympic hurdler
 Chase Williamson, actor and producer
 July 8
 Ashley Bowyer, soccer player
 Jordan Burroughs, Olympic wrestler
 July 9
 Mark Angelosetti, wrestler
 Belal Muhammad, mixed martial artist
 July 10 
 Antonio Brown, football player
 Heather Hemmens, actress
 July 11 – Christian Camacho, soccer player
 July 12
 Patrick Beverley, basketball player
 LeSean McCoy, football player
 Christine Marie Cabanos, actress
 July 13
 Colton Haynes, actor and model
 Chris Sheffield, actor
 Steven R. McQueen, actor and model
 July 14
 Kai Correa, baseball coach
 Travis Ganong, Olympic alpine skier
 Chase Williamson, actor and film producer
 July 15 – Aimee Carrero, Dominican-born actress
 July 17
 Summer Bishil, actress
 Patrick Crosby, lacrosse player
 Anderson East, musician
 Luke Stocker, football player
 July 18 – Ambyr Childers, actress
 July 19 
 Shane Dawson, internet personality, actor, comedian, director, and author
 Cherami Leigh, actress 
 Trent Williams, football player
 July 20
 Phillip Adams, football player and killer (d. 2021)
 Lucas Baiano, filmmaker
 Quinton Carter, football player
 Julianne Hough, ballroom dancer, country singer, and actress
 Stephen Strasburg, baseball player
 July 21
 Blake Allen, composer
 Jon Asamoah, football player
 Edawn Coughman, football player
 DeAndre Jordan, basketball player
 Nina Roth, Olympic curler
 July 22
 Alex Caskey, soccer player
 George Santos, politician
 July 23 – Kevin Tway, golfer
 July 24
 Charlee Brooks, vocalist, composer, and audio engineer
 Chris Cortez, soccer player
 July 25 – Linsey Godfrey, actress
 July 26
 AJ Agazarm, mixed martial artist
 Francia Raisa, actress
 Caitlin Gerard, actress
 July 27 – Luke Collis, football player
 July 28 
 Ayla Brown, basketball player and singer
 Greg Hardy, football player
 Nick Santino, singer/songwriter and frontman for A Rocket to the Moon (2006-2013)
 July 29 – Matthew Bouraee, soccer player
 July 30 – Nico Tortorella, actor and model
 July 31
 Remy Banks, rapper
 Kyra Harris Bolden, politician
 Charlie Carver, actor
 A. J. Green, football player
 Krystal Meyers, singer/songwriter and musician

August

 August 1 – Max Carver, actor
 August 2 – Golden Tate, football player 
 August 3
 Amanda Bell, mixed martial artist
 Ricky Blaze, DJ, producer, and singer/songwriter
 DRAM, rapper and singer/songwriter
 Weyes Blood, DJ, producer, and singer/songwriter
 August 4 – Aaron Pauley, singer, bassist, and frontman for Of Mice & Men (2012–present) and Jamie's Elsewhere
 August 5
 David Castain, entrepreneur and philanthropist
 Salwa Aga Khan, fashion model and aristocrat
 August 6
 Anthony Allen, football player
 DaNae Couch, beauty pageant titleholder, Miss Texas 2012
 August 7
 Danario Alexander, football player
 Marti Belle, wrestler
 Jordan Cameron, football player
 August 8
 Eric Brakey, politician
 Tiana Coudray, Olympic equestrian and dancer
 Chad Future, actor, director, singer, and host
 Laura Slade Wiggins, actress, singer, and musician
 August 9 – Anthony Castonzo, football player
 August 12
 Mark Arcobello, ice hockey player
 Justin Gaston, singer/songwriter, model, and actor
 Leah Pipes, actress
 August 13
 Keith Benson, basketball player
 Nili Brosh, Israeli-born singer and guitarist
 Servando Carrasco, soccer player
 August 15 – Andy Miele, Olympic ice hockey player
 August 16
 Boyfriend, singer/songwriter, producer, rapper, and performance artist
 Nate Cohn, journalist and political analyst
 Ryan Kerrigan, football player
 Rumer Willis, actress and singer
 Parker Young, actor
 August 17
 Bianca Collins, actress, curator, and writer
 Brady Corbet, actor and filmmaker
 Tino Coury, singer/songwriter
 Chris Culliver, football player
 Kathryn Morgan, ballerina
 August 18
 Jorge Avila-Torrez, convicted serial killer and rapist
 Scout Bassett, Chinese-born Paralympic long jumper
 August 19
 Ty Abbott, basketball player
 Hoodie Allen, hip-hop artist
 Kirk Cousins, football player
 Veronica Roth, author
 Romeo Miller, basketball player, rapper, actor
 August 20
 Jerryd Bayless, basketball player
 Lincoln A. Castellanos, actor
 August 21
 Paris Bennett, singer and American Idol contestant
 Kacey Musgraves, country singer
 August 22 – Javy Ayala, mixed martial artist
 August 23
 Devan Carroll, soccer player
 Jaime Churches, politician
 Jeremy Lin, basketball player
 Kim Matula, actress
 August 24 – Nicholas Alexander, Olympic ski jumper
 August 25
 Terrence Austin, football player
 Caleb Bostic, football player
 Tony Cosentino, stock car racing driver
 August 26
 Elvis Andrus, Venezuelan-born baseball player
 Lance Benoist, mixed martial artist
 Tori Black, pornographic actress
 Evan Ross, actor and musician
 Tom Coolican, American-born Australian rugby player
 Danielle Savre, actress and singer
 August 27
 A. J. Achter, baseball player
 Sean Chen, pianist
 Zach Collaros, football player
 Alexa Vega, actress and singer
 August 28
 Danny Aiken, football player
 Shalita Grant, actress
 August 30 – Alex Corbisiero, American-born English rugby player
 August 31
 Matt Adams, baseball player
 Athena, wrestler
 Allen Bradford, football player
 Tanaya Henry, model and actress

September

 September 1 
 Gabriel Ferrari, soccer player
 Chanel West Coast, rapper, singer, actress, model, and television personality
 September 2 – Matt Wentworth, guitarist and vocalist for Our Last Night
 September 3
 Katie Bethke, soccer player
 Derwin Montgomery, politician
 September 4
 Pilar Bosley, ice dancer
 Kervin Bristol, Haitian-born basketball player
 Anna Li, gymnast
 September 5 – Ibrahim Abdulai, football player
 September 6
 Sam Acho, football player
 Willdabeast Adams, dancer and choreographer
 Jovan Adepo, British-born actor
 September 7
 Kevin Aguilar, mixed martial artist
 Jack Crawford, football player
 Paul Iacono, actor
 Kevin Love, basketball player
 September 8
 Arrelious Benn, football player
 E. J. Bonilla, actor
 Rob Bunker, stock car racing driver
 September 9
 Gary Brown, baseball player
 Roc Carmichael, football player
 McKey Sullivan, fashion model
 September 10
 Queen Claye, Olympic hurdler and sprinter
 Jared Lee Loughner, convicted spree killer (2011 Tucson shooting)
 September 13
 Nadia Aboulhosn, fashion blogger, model, and designer
 John Park, singer
 September 14 – Bobby Brackins, rapper
 September 15
 Kent Bulle, golfer
 Chelsea Kane, actress and singer
 Chloe Dykstra, actress
 September 16
 Talor Battle, basketball player
 Durand Bernarr, singer/songwriter and producer
 Corben Bone, soccer player
 B. J. Coleman, football player
 Teddy Geiger, singer/songwriter
 September 18
 Arizona Muse, model
 Shoshana Bush, actress
 Wesley Carroll, football player
 Casey Crosby, baseball player
 September 21
 Doug Baldwin, football player
 Melvin Gregg, actor, model, and comedian
 September 19
 Katrina Bowden, actress
 Kenny Britt, football player
 September 20 – Clark James Gable, actor, model, and television presenter (d. 2019)
 September 21 – Doug Baldwin, football player
 September 22
 Jack Avesyan, soccer player
 Colin Braun, stock car racing driver
 Bethany Dillon, contemporary Christian music artist
 September 23
 Antonio Allen, football player
 Mindy Cook, Paralympic goalball player
 September 24
 Lisa Belcastro, politician
 Curtis Brown, football player
 Paul Carey, ice hockey player
 Steven Kampfer, Olympic ice hockey player
 Kyle Sullivan, actor
 September 26
 Sadam Ali, boxer
 Chris Archer, baseball player
 September 29
 Jeff Attinella, soccer player
 Kevin Durant, basketball player
 Justin Nozuka, American-born Canadian singer/songwriter

October

 October 1
 Marjorie Conrad, French-born filmmaker and model
 Nick Whitaker, actor
 October 2
 Brittany Howard, musician
 Corrin Campbell, vocalist, bassist, songwriter, and pianist
 October 3
 A$AP Rocky, rapper and music video director
 Mike Belfiore, baseball player
 October 4
 Melissa Benoist, actress and singer
 Sean Cattouse, football player
 Lonnie Chisenhall, baseball player
 Derrick Rose, basketball player
 October 5 – Kevin Olusola, singer/songwriter and musician
 October 6
 Bryan Anger, football player
 Austin Berry, soccer player
 October 7
 Katie Burnett, racewalker
 Chimdi Chekwa, football player
 Brandon Cunniff, baseball player
 October 8 – Manny Barreda, American-born Mexican baseball player
 October 9 – John Chiles, football player
 October 10
 Gilbert Bayonne, soccer player
 Claudine Beckford, Jamaican-born cricketer
 Alex Chappell, journalist
 October 11
 Toney Clemons, football player
 Ricochet, wrestler
 October 12 – Jermie Calhoun, football player
 October 13 – Norris Cole, basketball player
 October 14
 Max Thieriot, actor
 MacKenzie Mauzy, actress
 Pia Toscano, singer and American Idol contestant
 October 15 – Leah Cole Allen, politician
 October 16
 Tumua Anae, water polo player
 Ron Brooks, football player
 October 17
 Kathleen Alcott, novelist
 Donald Butler, football player
 Justin Clark, soccer player
 Christina Crawford, wrestler
 Dee Jay Daniels, actor
 October 18
 Kyle Austin, basketball player
 Dane Cameron, racing driver
 October 19
 Xavier Alexander, basketball player
 Jalil Anibaba, soccer player
 October 20
 ASAP Ferg, rapper
 Mario Butler, football player
 Anthony Sabatini, politician
 October 21
 Andrew Cancio, boxer
 ContraPoints, YouTuber
 Hope Hicks, public relations consultant and White House communications director
 Glen Powell, Actor
 October 22
 Marqus Blakely, basketball player
 Corey Hawkins, actor
 October 23
 Nia Ali, Olympic hurdler and heptathlete
 Jake Collier, mixed martial artist
 Jordan Crawford, basketball player
 October 24
 Nastassja Bolívar, American-born Nicaraguan beauty pageant titleholder, Miss Nicaragua 2013
 Jeremy Cota, freestyle skier
 October 25
 Chase Buford, basketball player and coach
 Alberto Cabrera, baseball player
 October 27 – Evan Turner, basketball player
 October 28 – Ian Conyers, politician
 October 29
 Cortez Allen, football player
 Deidre Behar, writer, producer, and host
 October 30 – Janel Parrish, actress and singer
 October 31
 Cole Aldrich, basketball player
 Conroy Black, football player
 Jennie Clark, soccer player

November

 November 1 – Robert Alford, football player
 November 2 – Lindze Letherman, actress
 November 3
 Kendrick Adams, football player
 Holland Andrews, singer
 Trevor Einhorn, actor
 November 4
 Avi Berkowitz, attorney and political adviser
 Dez Bryant, football player
 November 5 – Justin Cornwell, actor, writer, and musician
 November 6
 Sean Baker, football player
 Eric Cray, Philippine-born Olympic sprinter and hurdler
 Robert Ellis, singer/songwriter and guitarist
 Emma Stone, actress
 November 7
 Ayo the Producer, hip hop artist
 Reid Ewing, actor
 November 8
 Matt Braly, animator, storyboard artist, director, writer, and producer
 Jared Kusnitz, actor
 November 9 
 Nikki Blonsky, actress and singer
 Curt Casali, baseball player
 Analeigh Tipton, actress and fashion model
 November 10
 Sunny Choi, breakdancer
 Rennie Curran, football player, speaker, and coach
 Jonna Mannion, television personality
 November 11 – Alexandra Kyle, actress
 November 12
 Levy Adcock, football player
 Robert Arnold, basketball player
 Joe Banyard, football player
 Jason Chen, pop singer
 Russell Westbrook, basketball player
 November 13 – Max Miller, politician
 November 14
 John Brancy, baritone player
 Jos Charles, poet, writer, translator, and editor
 Michael Cox, football player
 November 15
 B.o.B., rapper, singer, record producer, and conspiracy theorist
 Nikolas Besagno, soccer player
 Lauren Cholewinski, Olympic speed skater
 November 16
 Gary Boughton, soccer player
 Clint Bowles, tennis player
 William Coleman, basketball player
 Brandon Cumpton, baseball player
 November 17
 Hilary Barte, tennis player
 Justin Cooper, actor
 November 18
 Travis Baltz, football player
 Elaine Breeden, Olympic swimmer
 Jeffrey Jordan, basketball player
 November 19 – Patrick Kane, ice hockey player
 November 20
 Cody Allen, baseball player
 Barry Almeida, ice hockey player
 Max Pacioretty, ice hockey player
 Demetrius Shipp Jr., actor
 November 21 – Joseph Anderson, football player
 November 22
 Sean Beighton, curler
 Matt Bruenig, lawyer, blogger, policy analyst, and commentator
 November 25
 Jonathon Amaya, football player
 John Corona, ice dancer
 PopularMMOs, YouTuber
 November 26 – Blake Harnage, songwriter, music producer, multi-instrumentalist, composer, vocalist, and guitarist for VersaEmerge
 November 28 – Scarlett Pomers, actress
 November 29
 Dana Brooke, wrestler
 Russell Wilson, football player
 November 30
 Terry Broadhurst, ice hockey player
 James Brown, football player
 Rebecca Rittenhouse, actress
 Rotimi, actor and singer

December

 December 1
 Ashley Monique Clark, actress
 Tyler Joseph, singer
 Zoë Kravitz, actress, singer, and Model
 December 2 – Rosie Brennan, Olympic cross-country skier
 December 3 – Jeb Brovsky, soccer player
 December 4
 Rodney Austin, football player
 Jerry Belmontes, boxer
 Hilary Cruz, actor, model, and beauty queen, Miss Teen USA 2007
 December 5
 Ross Bagley, actor
 Tina Charles, basketball player
 December 7 – Nathan Adrian, Olympic swimmer
 December 8 – Brittany Dawn Brannon, actress, host, model, beauty pageant titleholder, and Miss Arizona USA 2011
 December 11
 Erik Burgdoerfer, ice hockey player
 Christina Hagan, politician
 December 12
 Ahmad Black, football player
 Steven Bonnell II, streamer better known as Destiny
 Diondre Borel, football player
 December 14
 Alexandra Agre, curler
 David Borrero, politician
 Amber Brown, mixed martial artist
 Nate Ebner, football player
 Vanessa Hudgens, Actress and singer
 December 15 – Kimora Blac, drag queen and television personality
 December 16
 Christopher Caluag, American-born Philippine BMX racer
 Circuit des Yeux, singer/songwriter
 December 18 – Erica Rivera, actress, singer, rapper, dancer, and artist
 December 20
 Omar Bolden, football player
 Nick Charlton, football coach
 December 21
 Kevin Anderson, basketball player
 Mark Blane, actor, writer, and director
 Markeith Cummings, basketball player
 Danny Duffy, baseball player
 Teresa Ruiz, Mexican-born actress
 December 23
 Everitte Barbee, calligrapher
 Mallory Hagan, beauty pageant titleholder
 December 24
 Michelle Boulos, figure skater
 Kodi Burns, football player
 Trey Caldwell, politician
 December 25
 Heather Cooke, American-born Filipino soccer player
 Eric Gordon, basketball player
 December 26 – Rudy Cerami, football player
 December 27
 Abby Finkenauer, politician
 Hayley Williams, lead singer of Paramore
 December 28
 Katlyn Chookagian, mixed martial artist
 Leslie Cichocki, Paralympic swimmer
 December 29 – Eric Berry, football player
 December 30
 Bryce Brentz, baseball player
 Danny Burawa, baseball player
 Jena Sims, actress
 December 31 – Matthew Atkinson, actor and musician

Full Date Unknown

 Niv Acosta, dancer, choreographer, and artist
 Kameron Alexander, singer/songwriter and record producer
 Olivia Alexander, singer, dancer, and actress
 Brian Altman, poker player
 Brent Anderson, country singer
 Gretchen Andrew, artist
 Adeem the Artist, country singer
 Rodelio Astudillo, photographer
 Mamoudou Athie, Mauritanian-born actor
 Angad Aulakh, filmmaker
 Milton Barney Jr., baseball player and coach
 Jose Batista, politician
 Marguerite Bennett, comic book writer
 Tori Black, pornographic actress
 Andrew M. Boss, composer
 Matt Bouldin, basketball player
 Danika Brace, football player and coach
 Blair Braverman, adventurer, dogsled racer, musher, advice columnist, and nonfiction writer
 Serafina Brocious, software engineer
 Imani Jacqueline Brown, researcher and artist
 Nakeya Brown, photographer
 John Burke, pianist
 Corrin Campbell, musician
 Kyle Carey, folk singer
 Reagan Charleston, jewelry designer, lawyer, and television personality
 Thomas Chung, artist
 Lenny Cooper, country rapper
 Chris Cottrell, founder of The Reading Initiative
 Jessa Dillow Crisp, survivor of human trafficking and co-founder and executive director of Bridge Hope Now
 Crudo Means Raw, rapper and beatmaker
 Jacob Cutrera, football player

Deaths

 January 3 
 William Cagney, actor (born 1905)
 Joie Chitwood, race car driver and stuntman (born 1912)
 January 5 – Pete Maravich, basketball player (born 1947)
 January 7 – Zara Cisco Brough, Nipmuc Chief (born 1919)
 January 11 
 Pappy Boyington, pilot, United States Marine Corps fighter ace (born 1912)
 Isidor Isaac Rabi, physicist, winner of Nobel Prize in Physics in 1944 for invention of the atomic beam magnetic resonance method of measuring magnetic properties of atoms and molecules (born 1898 in Poland)
 January 12 – Hiram Bingham IV, American diplomat (born 1903)  
 January 22  – Parker Fennelly, comedian and actor (born 1891)
 January 25 – Colleen Moore, actress (born 1899)
 February 1 – Heather O'Rourke, actress (born 1975)
 February 3 – Robert Duncan, poet (born 1919)
 February 14 – Frederick Loewe, composer (born 1901 in Berlin)
 February 15 – Richard Feynman, theoretical physicist, winner of Nobel Prize in Physics in 1965 for work on quantum electrodynamics (born 1918)
 February 28 – Harvey Kuenn, baseball player and coach (born 1930)
 March 1 – Joe Besser, actor and comedian (born 1907)
 March 3 – Lois Wilson, actress (born 1894)
 March 5 – Margaret Irving, actress (born 1898)
 March 7
 Edmund Berkeley, computer scientist (born 1909)
 Divine, drag singer and character actor (born 1945)
 Robert Livingston, screen actor (born 1904)
 March 8 – Deane Janis, singer (born 1904)
 March 10 – Glenn Cunningham, Olympic athlete (born 1909)
 March 12 – Karen Steele, actress (born 1931)
 March 13
 Olive Carey, actress (born 1896)  
 John Holmes, pornographic actor (born 1944) 
 March 16 – Dorothy Adams, American character actress (born 1900)
 March 18
 Joan Field, violinist (born 1915)
 Frank Wayne, game show producer and host (born 1917)
 March 20 – Gil Evans, American jazz pianist (born 1912) 
 March 21 – Edd Roush, baseball player (Cincinnati Reds) and member of the MLB Hall of Fame (born 1893)
 March 22 – Lester Rawlins, stage and screen director (born 1924)
 March 25 – Robert Joffrey, dancer and choreographer (born 1930)
 April 3 – Milton Caniff, cartoonist (born 1907) 
 April 9 – Dave Prater, rhythm and blues singer (born 1937)  
 April 11 – Jesse L. Lasky Jr., screenwriter (born 1910)
 April 17 – Eva Novak, actress (born 1898)
 April 22 – Irene Rich, actress (born 1891)
 April 25
 Carolyn Franklin, singer (born 1944)
 Valerie Solanas, radical feminist, attempted murderer of Andy Warhol (born 1936)
 April 26 
 James McCracken, tenor (born 1926)
 Frederick D. Patterson, academic administrator (born 1901)
 May 8
 Robert A. Heinlein science fiction author (born 1907)
 Ruby M. Rouss, WAC and first female President of the Virgin Islands Legislature (born 1921)
 May 13 – Chet Baker, jazz trumpeter (born 1929)
 May 15 – Andrew Duggan, actor (born 1923)
 May 16 – Kay Baxter, bodybuilder (born 1945)
 May 18 – Daws Butler, voice actor (born 1916)
 May 20 –  Laurie Dann, murderer (born 1957)
 May 21 – Sammy Davis Sr., American dancer (b. 1900)
 May 27 – Florida Friebus, actor (born 1909)
 May 30 – Ella Raines, screen actress (born 1920)
 June 8 – Eli Mintz, actor (born 1904)
 June 10 – Louis L'Amour, western novelist (born 1908)
 June 11 – Nathan Cook, actor (born 1950)
 June 16 – Kim Milford, actor and singer (born 1951)
 June 18 
 Wilford Leach, theater director (born 1929)
 E. Hoffmann Price, writer (born 1898)
 June 22
 Dennis Day, singer and radio and television personality (born 1916)
 Stuart Randall, actor (born 1909)
 June 23 – Henry Murray, psychologist (born 1893) 
 July 3 – Gabriel Dell, actor (born 1919)  
 June 25 – Hillel Slovak, Israeli-American guitarist (Red Hot Chili Peppers) (born 1962)
 July 4 – Adrian Adonis, professional wrestler (born 1954) 
 July 8 – Ray Barbuti, athlete (born 1905)
 July 12 – Joshua Logan, stage and film writer (born 1908)
 July 17 – Bruiser Brody, professional wrestler (born 1946) 
 July 21 – Jack Clark, television personality and game show host (born 1921)
 July 25 – Judith Barsi, actress and murder victim (born 1978)
 July 27 – Frank Zamboni, inventor (born 1901)
 July 31 – Trinidad Silva, actor (born 1950)
 August 5 – Ralph Meeker, actor (born 1920)
 August 8 
 Alan Ameche, footballer (born 1933)
 Alan Napier, actor (born 1903 in the United Kingdom)
 August 10 – Adela Rogers St. Johns, journalist and screenwriter (born 1893) 
 August 17 – Franklin Delano Roosevelt Jr., American lawyer and politician (born 1914)  
 August 21 – Ray Eames, architect and designer, partner of Charles Eames (born 1912)
 August 24 – Leonard Frey, actor (born 1938)
 August 27 – Kerry Lloyd, American role-playing game designer (born 1941)
 August 28 
 Hazel Dawn, actress (born 1890)
 Max Shulman, novelist, short-story writer and dramatist (born 1919)
 September 1 – Luis Walter Alvarez, experimental physicist, winner of Nobel Prize in Physics in 1968 for bubble chamber research into particle physics (born 1911)
 September 6 – Harold Rosson, cinematographer (born 1895) 
 September 11 – John Sylvester White, actor (born 1919)
 September 21 
 Glenn Robert Davis, politician (born 1914)
 Henry Koster, German-born film director (born 1905)
 September 25 – Billy Carter, farmer, businessman, brewer, and politician (born 1937)
 September 28 
 Charles Addams, cartoonist (born 1912)
 Ethel Grandin, actress (born 1894)
 September 30 – Joachim Prinz, German-born American rabbi (born 1902)  
 October 7 – Billy Daniels, singer (born 1915)
 October 10 – Kurt Marshall, model and actor (born 1965)  
 October 11
 Morgan Farley, actor (born 1898)  
 Wayland Flowers, puppeteer (born 1939)  
 October 12 – Ken Murray, actor (born 1903)  
 October 31 – John Houseman, screen actor-producer (born 1902 in Romania)
 November 1 – George J. Folsey, cinematographer (born 1898)
 November 9 – John N. Mitchell, lawyer, 67th United States Attorney General (born 1913)
 November 12 – Lyman Lemnitzer, Army General (born 1899)
 November 25 – Alphaeus Philemon Cole, portrait artist, engraver and supercentenarian (born 1876)
 November 27 – Angela Aames, American actress (born 1956)
 November 29 – Donald Keyhoe, American ufologist (born 1897)
 December 6 
 Timothy Patrick Murphy, actor (born 1959)
 Roy Orbison, singer-songwriter and guitarist (born 1936)
 December 7
 Christopher Connelly, actor (born 1941)
 Dorothy Jordan, actress (born 1906)
 December 14 – Stuart Symington, politician (born 1901)
 December 17 – Jerry Hopper, film and television director (born 1907)
 December 20 – Max Robinson, broadcast journalist, and ABC News World News Tonight co-anchor (born 1939)
 December 21
 Willie Kamm, baseball player (born 1900)
 Bob Steele, actor (born 1907)
 December 26 – Glenn McCarthy, oil tycoon and businessman (born 1907)
 December 27
 Hal Ashby, film director (born 1929)
 Jess Oppenheimer, radio and television producer (born 1913)
 December 30 – Isamu Noguchi, artist and landscape architect (born 1904)

Undated
Thomas Greenwood, Illinois labor and Indian affairs activist (b. 1908)

See also
1988 North American drought
 1988 in American television
 List of American films of 1988
 Timeline of United States history (1970–1989)

References

External links
 

 
1980s in the United States
United States
United States
Years of the 20th century in the United States